Mikhaylovka is a rural locality (a selo) in Diyashevsky Selsoviet, Bakalinsky District, Bashkortostan, Russia. The population was 162 as of 2010.

Geography 
It is located 19 km from Bakaly and 5 km from Diyashevo.

References 

Rural localities in Bakalinsky District